Methley Junction railway station was one of three stations that served the village of Methley, West Yorkshire, England. It opened on 1 October 1849 and closed on 4 October 1943.

The station was built by the Lancashire and Yorkshire Railway on its line from Knottingley which joined the line of the North Midland Railway (currently used by the Hallam Line) north of the junction of the Woodlesford–Castleford (Midland) and the Woodlesford–Normanton (North Eastern Railway) tracks. South of the station, the Methley Joint Railway to Lofthouse branched off from the Lancashire and Yorkshire line. The site of the former station is now part of a housing estate.

See also
Methley railway station
Methley South railway station

References

External links
 Methley Junction station (shown closed) on navigable 1947 O. S. map

Disused railway stations in Leeds
Former Lancashire and Yorkshire Railway stations
Railway stations in Great Britain opened in 1849
Railway stations in Great Britain closed in 1943
1849 establishments in England
Rothwell, West Yorkshire